Tanvie Hans is an Indian-born British professional footballer who plays as a midfielder for Misaka United in the Karnataka Women's League. She also plays for Karnataka women's football team. She previously played for English clubs Tottenham Hotspurs and Fulham, and later appeared with Sethu FC in 2017–18 Indian Women's League.

Personal life 
Born in Delhi to Punjabi parents, Hans went to Vasant Valley School, which was the first school in Delhi to introduce an all-girls football team. She later went to Jesus and Mary College of the Delhi University in Delhi. She then switched to become a British citizen and studied in the United Kingdom. Later in 2019, she began her process of being an Indian citizen.

{{Cquote|I have always had a heart for India and I was few of the very fortunate ones who got to play in England at pretty decent levels. I have always considered it a privilege and responsibility to give back to the country that invested in my dream. I also know for a fact that if a difference can be made by me, it can be made over here in India. But it's never easy and it is a lot of work. I was restricted from playing for India because of my British citizenship and I am in the process of converting my citizenship to Indian. It's not an easy procedure and I'm trying very hard. Hopefully, 2019 is my year and I can be a part of Indian football here on."|source=Tanvie Hans, on her dream of representing the India women's national team.|Cquote}}

Club career

United Kingdom
Hans began her professional club career in the UK. After a few trials, she packed her bag to play football for FA Women's Super League side Tottenham Hotspurs Women in 2013. She later moved to Fulham L.F.C. in 2015, that competes in the London and South East Women's Regional Football League.

India
After stints in England, Hans moved back to India with her parents, both Indians, she broke the boundaries, as she began to compete in The Amateur League (TAL) in Bengaluru, a competition that is predominantly played by men.

She later signed with Sethu FC and appeared in the 2017–18 Indian Women's League season. Her exploits brought her to Bengaluru when she sported the colours of Parikrama FC for two seasons from 2019, before being roped in by Bangalore United FC for the 2021–22 season.

Hans also attended a couple of national camps of the India national team, but never appeared with The Blue Tigresses'' due to having British passport.

Hans was appointed the captain of the Karnataka women's football team for the 2021–22 edition of the Senior Women's National Football Championship held at Kerala. She joined the Misaka United FC which plays in the Karnataka Women's League for the 2022–23 season.

Honours

Misaka United
 Karnataka Women's League runner-up: 2022–23

See also 

List of Indian football players in foreign leagues
List of people from Delhi

References

External links 

News on Tanvie Hans at TOI
Tanvie Hans at The Bridge

1990 births
Living people
Footballers from Delhi
Indian women's footballers
English women's footballers
Women's Super League players
Fulham L.F.C. players
Tottenham Hotspur F.C. Women players
Sethu FC players
Women's association football midfielders
Expatriate women's footballers in India
Indian emigrants to England
English people of Indian descent
British sportspeople of Indian descent
British people of Punjabi descent
British Asian footballers
British expatriates in India
Indian expatriate footballers
Indian expatriate sportspeople in England
English expatriate footballers
English expatriate sportspeople in India
Delhi University alumni
Indian Women's League players